Raymond V (c. 1134 – c. 1194) was Count of Toulouse from 1148 until his death in 1194.

He was the son of Alphonse I of Toulouse and Faydida of Provence. Alphonse took his son with him on the Second Crusade in 1147. When Alphonse died in Caesarea in 1148, the county of Toulouse passed to his son Raymond, then aged 14. The young count was honoured by Rorgo Fretellus, archdeacon of Nazareth, who dedicated a new edition of his Description of the Holy Places to him.

As count, Raymond permitted the first assembly of townsmen in Toulouse, the origin of the later capitouls.

In 1165, in the town of Lombers, the Bishop of Albi, attended by both clerics and members of the nobility, including Constance, the wife of Raymond V, interrogated and debated with members of an alleged heretical sect. Calling themselves "Good Men", this group held beliefs similar to those of Henry of Lausanne and Peter of Bruys as well as indicating Cathar influence. While the Good Men declined to respond to a number of questions about their beliefs, they told the bishop that they did not accept the Old Testament, and that their reading of the New Testament persuaded them that they should not take oaths. They further challenged the jurisdiction of the bishop.

In 1178 Raymond requested assistance from the Cistercians to combat heresy in his dominions. Wakefield suggests that being under pressure on his western border from King Alfonso II of Aragon, Raymond wished to present himself as a defender of the faith. A joint legatine and royal commission arrived in Toulouse charged with authority to preach, investigate, and condemn. It operated for three months.

Family
In 1153/6, Raymond married Constance, daughter of King Louis VI of France by his second wife, Adelaide of Maurienne. Constance was the widow of Eustace IV, Count of Boulogne. Because Raymond was related to her within prohibited degrees, they were separated by ecclesiastical authority in 1165. They had five children:
Raymond VI, who succeeded his father as Count of Toulouse
Aubri, died 1180
Adelaide or Azalais of Toulouse, who married Roger II Trencavel in 1171 and died in 1199
Baldwin, born 1165, executed on the orders of Raymond VI in 1214

He was engaged with Richeza of Poland, widow of Ramon Berenguer II, Count of Provence.

Raymond also had an illegitimate daughter:

 Indie (July 1192 – 27 September 1249), who married firstly Guilabert de Lautrec (d.1215), and secondly Bernard de L'Isle-Jourdain (d.1228), and had issue.

References

Sources

1130s births
1194 deaths
Counts of Toulouse
Dukes of Narbonne
Margraves of Provence
Occitan nobility